A liposome is a small artificial vesicle, spherical in shape, having at least one lipid bilayer. Due to their hydrophobicity and/or hydrophilicity, biocompatibility, particle size and many other properties, liposomes can be used as drug delivery vehicles for administration of pharmaceutical drugs and nutrients, such as lipid nanoparticles in mRNA vaccines, and DNA vaccines.  Liposomes can be prepared by disrupting biological membranes (such as by sonication).

Liposomes are most often composed of phospholipids, especially phosphatidylcholine and cholesterol, but may also include other lipids, such as egg, phosphatidylethanolamine, as long as they are compatible with lipid bilayer structure. A liposome design may employ surface ligands for attaching to unhealthy tissue.

The major types of liposomes are the multilamellar vesicle (MLV, with several lamellar phase lipid bilayers), the small unilamellar liposome vesicle (SUV, with one lipid bilayer), the large unilamellar vesicle (LUV), and the cochleate vesicle. A less desirable form are multivesicular liposomes in which one vesicle contains one or more smaller vesicles.

Liposomes should not be confused with lysosomes, or with micelles and reverse micelles composed of monolayers.

Discovery
The word liposome derives from two Greek words: lipo ("fat") and soma ("body"); it is so named because its composition is primarily of phospholipid.

Liposomes were first described by British haematologist Alec Douglas Bangham in 1961 (published 1964), at the Babraham Institute, in Cambridge. They were discovered when Bangham and R. W. Horne were testing the institute's new electron microscope by adding negative stain to dry phospholipids. The resemblance to the plasmalemma was obvious, and the microscope pictures served as the first  evidence for the cell membrane being a bilayer lipid structure. Their integrity as a closed, bilayer structure, that could release its contents after detergent treatment (structure-linked latency) was established by Bangham, Standish and Weissmann in the next year. Weissmann - during a Cambridge pub discussion with Bangham - first named the structures "liposomes" after the lysosome, which his laboratory had been studying: a simple organelle the structure-linked latency of which could be disrupted by detergents and streptolysins. Liposomes can be easily distinguished from micelles and hexagonal lipid phases by negative staining transmission electron microscopy.

Alec Douglas Bangham with colleagues Jeff Watkins and Malcolm Standish wrote the 1965 paper that effectively launched the liposome “industry”. Around this time he was joined at Babraham by Gerald Weissmann, an American physician with an interest in lysosomes. Now an emeritus professor at New York University School of Medicine, Weissmann recalls the two of them sitting in a Cambridge pub and reflecting on the role of lipid sheets in separating the interior of the cell from the exterior milieu. This insight, they felt, was to cell function what the discovery of the double helix had been to genetics. Bangham had called his lipid structures “multilamellar smectic mesophases” or sometimes “Banghasomes”. It was Weissmann who proposed the more user-friendly term liposome.

Mechanism

A liposome has an aqueous solution core surrounded by a hydrophobic membrane, in the form of a lipid bilayer; hydrophilic solutes dissolved in the core cannot readily pass through the bilayer. Hydrophobic chemicals associate with the bilayer. A liposome can be hence loaded with hydrophobic and/or hydrophilic molecules. To deliver the molecules to a site of action, the lipid bilayer can fuse with other bilayers such as the cell membrane, thus delivering the liposome contents; this is a complex and non-spontaneous event, however, that does not apply to nutrients and drug delivery. By preparing liposomes in a solution of DNA or drugs (which would normally be unable to diffuse through the membrane) they can be (indiscriminately) delivered past the lipid bilayer. Liposomes are used as models for artificial cells. Liposomes can also be designed to deliver drugs in other ways. Liposomes that contain low (or high) pH can be constructed such that dissolved aqueous drugs will be charged in solution (i.e., the pH is outside the drug's pI range). As the pH naturally neutralizes within the liposome (protons can pass through some membranes), the drug will also be neutralized, allowing it to freely pass through a membrane. These liposomes work to deliver drug by diffusion rather than by direct cell fusion. However, the efficacy of this pH regulated passage depends on the physiochemical nature of the drug in question (e.g. pKa and having a basic or acid nature), which is very low for many drugs.

A similar approach can be exploited in the biodetoxification of drugs by injecting empty liposomes with a transmembrane pH gradient. In this case the vesicles act as sinks to scavenge the drug in the blood circulation and prevent its toxic effect.
Another strategy for liposome drug delivery is to target endocytosis events. Liposomes can be made in a particular size range that makes them viable targets for natural macrophage phagocytosis. These liposomes may be digested while in the macrophage's phagosome, thus releasing its drug. Liposomes can also be decorated with opsonins and ligands to activate endocytosis in other cell types.

The use of liposomes for transformation or transfection of DNA into a host cell is known as lipofection.

In addition to gene and drug delivery applications, liposomes can be used as carriers for the delivery of dyes to textiles, pesticides to plants, enzymes and nutritional supplements to foods, and cosmetics to the skin.

Liposomes are also used as outer shells of some microbubble contrast agents used in contrast-enhanced ultrasound.

Dietary and nutritional supplements
Until recently, the clinical uses of liposomes were for targeted drug delivery, but new applications for the oral delivery of certain dietary and nutritional supplements are in development.  This new application of liposomes is in part due to the low absorption and bioavailability rates of traditional oral dietary and nutritional tablets and capsules.  The low oral bioavailability and absorption of many nutrients is clinically well documented. Therefore, the natural encapsulation of lypophilic and hydrophilic nutrients within liposomes would be an effective method of bypassing the destructive elements of the gastric system and small intestines allowing the encapsulated nutrient to be efficiently delivered to the cells and tissues.

The term nutraceutical combines the words nutrient and pharmaceutical, originally coined by Stephen DeFelice, who defined nutraceuticals as “food or part of a food that provides medical or health benefits, including the prevention and/or treatment of a disease”. However, currently, there is no conclusive definition of nutraceuticals yet, to distinguish them from other food‐derived categories, such as food (dietary) supplements, herbal products, pre‐ and probiotics, functional foods, and fortified foods. Generally, this term is used to describe any product derived from food sources which is expected to provide health benefits additionally to the nutritional value of daily food. A wide range of nutrients or other substances with nutritional or physiological effects (EU Directive 2002/46/EC) might be present in these products, including vitamins, minerals, amino acids, essential fatty acids, fibres and various plants and herbal extracts. Liposomal nutraceuticals contain bioactive compounds with health-promoting effects. The encapsulation of bioactive compounds in liposomes is attractive as liposomes have been shown to be able to overcome serious hurdles bioactives would otherwise encounter in the gastrointestinal (GI) tract upon oral intake.

It is important to note that certain  factors have far-reaching effects on the percentage of liposome that are yielded in manufacturing, as well as the actual amount of realized liposome entrapment and the actual quality and long-term stability of the liposomes themselves.  They are the following:  (1) The actual manufacturing method and preparation of the liposomes themselves; (2) The constitution, quality, and type of raw phospholipid used in the formulation and manufacturing of the liposomes; (3) The ability to create homogeneous liposome particle sizes that are stable and hold their encapsulated payload.  These are the primary elements  in developing effective liposome carriers for use in dietary and nutritional supplements.

Manufacturing
The choice of liposome preparation method depends, i.a., on the following parameters: 
 the physicochemical characteristics of the material to be entrapped and those of the liposomal ingredients;
 the nature of the medium in which the lipid vesicles are dispersed
 the effective concentration of the entrapped substance and its potential toxicity;
 additional processes involved during application/delivery of the vesicles;
 optimum size, polydispersity and shelf-life of the vesicles for the intended application; and,
 batch-to-batch reproducibility and possibility of large-scale production of safe and efficient liposomal products
Useful liposomes rarely form spontaneously. They typically form after supplying enough energy to a dispersion of (phospho)lipids in a polar solvent, such as water, to break down multilamellar aggregates into oligo- or unilamellar bilayer vesicles.

Liposomes can hence be created by sonicating a dispersion of amphipatic lipids, such as phospholipids, in water. Low shear rates create multilamellar liposomes. The original aggregates, which have many layers like an onion, thereby form progressively smaller and finally unilamellar liposomes (which are often unstable, owing to their small size and the sonication-created defects). Sonication is generally considered a "gross" method of preparation as it can damage the structure of the drug to be encapsulated. Newer methods such as extrusion, micromixing and Mozafari method are employed to produce materials for human use. Using lipids other than phosphatidylcholine can greatly facilitate liposome preparation.

Prospect

Further advances in liposome research have been able to allow liposomes to avoid detection by the body's immune system, specifically, the cells of reticuloendothelial system (RES). These liposomes are known as "stealth liposomes". They were first proposed by G. Cevc and G. Blume and, independently and soon thereafter, the groups of L. Huang and V. Torchilin and are constructed with PEG (Polyethylene Glycol) studding the outside of the membrane. The PEG coating, which is inert in the body, allows for longer circulatory life for the drug delivery mechanism. Studies have also shown that PEGylated liposomes elicit anti-IgM antibodies, thus leading to an enhanced blood clearance of the liposomes upon re-injection, depending on lipid dose and time interval between injections. In addition to a PEG coating, some stealth liposomes also have some sort of biological species attached as a ligand to the liposome, to enable binding via a specific expression on the targeted drug delivery site. These targeting ligands could be monoclonal antibodies (making an immunoliposome), vitamins, or specific antigens, but must be accessible. Targeted liposomes can target certain cell type in the body and deliver drugs that would otherwise be systemically delivered. Naturally toxic drugs can be much less systemically toxic if delivered only to diseased tissues. Polymersomes, morphologically related to liposomes, can also be used this way. Also morphologically related to liposomes are highly deformable vesicles, designed for non-invasive transdermal material delivery, known as transfersomes.

Certain anticancer drugs such as doxorubicin (Doxil) and daunorubicin may be administered via liposomes. Liposomal cisplatin has received orphan drug designation for pancreatic cancer from EMEA.

Liposomes can be used on their own or in combination with traditional antibiotics as neutralizing agents of bacterial toxins. Many bacterial toxins evolved to target specific lipids of the host cells membrane and can be baited and neutralized by liposomes containing those specific lipid targets.

A study published in May 2018 also explored the potential use of liposomes as "nano-carriers" of fertilizing nutrients to treat malnourished or sickly plants. Results showed that these synthetic particles "soak into plant leaves more easily than naked nutrients", further validating the utilization of nanotechnology to increase crop yields.

See also
Azotosome
Lamella (cell biology)
Langmuir–Blodgett film
Lipid bilayer
Targeted drug delivery

References

External links

 Journal of Liposome Research

Membrane biology
Drug delivery devices
Dosage forms